Jeffrey Ford (born November 8, 1955) is an American writer in the fantastic genre tradition, although his works have spanned genres including fantasy, science fiction and mystery. His work is characterized by a sweeping imaginative power, humor, literary allusion, and a fascination with tales told within tales. He is a graduate of Binghamton University, where he studied with the novelist John Gardner.

He lives in Ohio and teaches writing part-time at Ohio Wesleyan University. He has also taught as a guest lecturer at the Clarion Workshop for Science Fiction and Fantasy Writers (2004 and 2012), The Antioch University Summer Writing Workshop (2013), LitReactor – 4 Week Online Horror Writing Course (2012), University of Southern Maine's Stonecoast MFA Program in Creative Writing (2011), The Richard Hugo House in Seattle, Washington, (2010).

Ford has contributed over 130 original short stories to numerous print and online magazines and anthologies: The Magazine of Fantasy & Science Fiction, MAD Magazine, Weird Tales, Clarkesworld Magazine, Tor.com, Lightspeed, Subterranean, Fantasy Magazine, The Oxford Book of American Short Stories, Best Science Fiction and Fantasy of the Year, Year’s Best Weird Fiction, Year’s Best Fantasy and Horror, New Jersey Noir, Stories, The Living Dead, The Faery Reel, After, The Dark, The Doll Collection, etc. His fiction has been translated into over fifteen languages and published around the world.

Awards 
His stories and novels have been nominated multiple times for the World Fantasy Award, the Hugo Award, the Nebula Award, the Theodore Sturgeon Award, the International Horror Guild Award, the Fountain Award, Shirley Jackson Award, the Edgar Allan Poe Award, the Bram Stoker Award, the Locus Award, the Seiun Award, the Grand Prix de l'Imaginaire, the Nowa Fantastyka Award, and the Hayakawa Award.

World Fantasy Award Winners
 The Physiognomy (1998)
 The Fantasy Writer's Assistant (2003)
 Creation (2003)
 Botch Town (2007) 
 The Drowned Life (2009) 
 The Shadow Year (2009) 
 A Natural History of Hell, Best Collection (2017) (nominee)

Nebula Award for Best Novelette
 The Empire of Ice Cream (2004)

Grand Prix de l'Imaginaire for best translated story
 Exo-Skeleton Town (2005)

The Fountain Award for excellence in the short story
 The Annals of Eelin-Ok (2005)

Edgar Allan Poe Award for Best Paperback Original
 The Girl in the Glass (2005)

Shirley Jackson Award
 The Shadow Year (2008) (Best Novel)
 A Natural History of Autumn (2012) 
 Crackpot Palace (2012) (Best Single-Author Short Story Collection)
 A Natural History of Hell (2016) (Best Single-Author Short Story Collection)

Bibliography

Novels
 Vanitas (1988)
 The Portrait of Mrs. Charbuque (2002)
 The Girl in the Glass (2005)
 The Cosmology of the Wider World (2005)
 The Shadow Year (2008)
 Ahab's Return (2018)

Well-Built City trilogy
The Physiognomy (1997)
 Memoranda (1999)
 The Beyond (2001)

Novellas 

 The Twilight Pariah (2017)
 Out of Body (2020)

Short stories 

"The Casket" (1981)
"Legacy" (1984)
"Rapture of the Deep" (1984)
"The Master of Fiction" (1988)
"Rose Country" (1989)
"Never" (1989)
"The Alchemist, Becalmed At Sea" (1989)
"The Cosmology of the Wider World" (1990)
"The Last Half" (1990)
"The Place Where nothing Moved" (1991)
"Eclipse" (1991)
"Couch Dancing" (1992)
"The Eighth Wonder" (1992)
"The Colossus of Roads" (1993)
"Every Richie There Is" (1993)
"A Hole in the Day" (1993)
"The Woman Who Counts Her Breath" (1994)
"The Delicate" (1994)
"On the Road to New Egypt" (1995)
"Rabbit Test" (1995)
"The White Man" (1995)
"Grass Island" (1995)
"At Reparata" (2000)
"Malthusian's Zombie" (2000)
"Pansolapia" (2001)
"High Tea With Jules Verne" (2001)
"The Far Oasis" (2001)
"Quiet Days in Purgatory" (2001)
"Horrors By Waters" (2001)
"The Honeyed Knot" (2001)
"Exo-Skeleton Town" (2001)
"Out of the Canyon" (2001)
"Floating in Lindrethool" (2001)
"Summer Afternoon" (2001)
"The Fantasy Writer's Assistant" (2002)
"Bright Morning" (2002)
"Creation" (2002)
"What's Sure to Come" (2002)
"The Green Word" (2002)
"Something By the Sea" (2002)
"The Beautiful Gelreesh" (2003)
"The Empire of Ice Cream" (2003)
"The Yellow Chamber" (2003)
"Present From the Past" (2003)
"Coffins on the River" (2003)
"The Annals of Eelin-Ok" (2004)
"Jupiter's Skull" (2004)
"The Weight of Words" (2004)
"A Night in the Tropics" (2004)
"The Trentino Kid" (2004)
"The Boatman's Holiday" (2005)
"Euroborean Lordosis" (2005)
"Figurative Synesthesia" (2005)
"The Scribble Mind" (2005)
"Giant Land" (2005)
"A Man of Light" (2005)
"Botch Town" (2006)
"The Night Whiskey" (2006)
"The Way He Does It" (2006)
"The Dreaming Wind" (2007)
"Under the Bottom of the Lake" (2007)
"Quitting Dreams" (2007)
"A Few Things About Ants" (2007)
"The Bedroom Light" (2007)
"Ariadne's Mother" (2007)
"The Drowned Life" (2007)
"The Manticore Spell" (2007)
"Daltharee" (2008)
"The Dream of Reason" (2008)
"After Moreau" (2008)
"The Fat One" (2008)
"The Dismantled Invention of Fate" (2008)
"The Seventh Expression of the Robot General" (2008)
"The Golden Dragon" (2008)
"The War Between Heaven and Hell Wallpaper" (2009)
"Weiroot" (2009)
"The Coral Heart" (2009)
"86 Deathdick Road" (2010)
"Ganesha" (2010)
"Sorcerer Minus" (2010)
"Dr. Lash Remembers" (2010)
"Polka-dots and Moonbeams" (2010)
"Down Atsion Road" (2010)
"Daddy Long Legs of the Evening" (2011)
"The Last Triangle" (2011)
"The Summer Palace" (2011)
"The Hag's Peak Affair" (2011)
"Gaslight" (2011)
"Sit the Dead" (2011)
"Relic" (2011)
"The Double of My Double Is Not My Double" (2011)
"Things To Do With Leftover Copies of President Bush's Autobiography" (2011)
"Glass Eels" (2011)
"A Natural History of Autumn" (2012)
"The Angel Seems" (2012)
"Blood Drive" (2012)
"The Fairy Enterprise" (2013)
"The Pittsburgh Technology" (2013)
"A Meeting in Oz" (2013)
"Spirits of Salt" (2013)
"Rocket Ship to Hell" (2013)
"A Terror" (2013)
"The Prelate's Commission" (2014)
"Mount Chary Galore" (2014)
"La Madre Del Oro" (2014)
"Hibbler's Minions" (2014)
"The Order of the Haunted Wood" (2014)
"The Thyme Fiend" (2015)
"In Havana" (2015)
"The 3 Snake Leaves" (2015)
"The Winter Wraith" (2015)
"Word Doll" (2015)
"The Blameless" (2016)
"The Thousand Eyes" (2016)
"Not Without Mercy" (2016)
"The Murmurations of Vienna Von Drome" (2017)
"The Five Pointed Spell" (2017)
"Witch Hazel" (2017)
"All the King's Men" (2017)
"The Bookcase Expedition" (2018)
"Thanksgiving" (2018)
"Big Dark Hole" (2018)
"Dick Shook" (2018)
"Sisyphus in Elysium" (2019)
"The Jeweled Wren" (2019)
"Snowman On a White Horse" (2019)
"Incorruptible" (2019)
"From the Balcony of the Idawolf Arms" (2020)
"Mr. Sacrobatus" (2020)
"Monster Eight" (2020)

Collections 

The Fantasy Writer's Assistant (2002)
The Empire of Ice Cream (2006)
The Drowned Life (2008)
Crackpot Palace: Stories (2012)
A Natural History of Hell (2016)
The Best of Jeffrey Ford (2020)
Big, Dark Hole (2021)

Curiosities columns in The Magazine of Fantasy & Science Fiction

Source:

Nonfiction
 Introduction to Carlos Hernandez's short story collection The Assimilated Cuban's Guide to Quantum Santeria, January 2016
 Introduction to Anna Tambour's short story collection The Finest Ass in the Universe, Ticonderoga Publications, July 2015
 Introduction to the Clarion Class of 2012's short story anthology The Red Volume, awkwardrobots.org, August 2014
 Introduction to Michael Cisco's novel The Traitor, Cenitpede Press, 2012.
 Introduction to Ekaterina Sedia's short story collection Moscow, But Dreaming, Prime Books, 2012.
 Introduction to John Langan's short story collection The Wide Carnivorous Sky, Hippocampus Press, 2013.
 Introduction to David Herter's novel  October Dark, Earthling Books, November 2009.
 Introduction to Robert Wexler's novel The Painting and the City, PS Publishing, UK, 2008.
 Essay on "The Metaphysics of Fiction Writing" included in end matter with story collection The Drowned Life, 2008.
 Essay on "Anatomy of Sleep" by Shelley Jackson for online magazine Heliotrope, Fall 2007.
 Essay "I Love a Mystery" for LitBlog Co-op site, May 4, 2006.
 Introduction to Richard Bowes' story collection Streetcar Dreams, PS Publishing, UK, 2006.
 Essay on "Lull" by Kelly Link for online magazine Fantastic Metropolis, Jan. 1, 2005.
 Introduction to John Gardner's Grendel, Fantasy Masterworks Series #41, Gollancz, UK, 2004
 Introduction to Jeff VanderMeer's story collection Secret Life, Golden Gryphon Press, 2004.
 Essay on "The Man Upstairs" by Ray Bradbury for Fantastic Metropolis, Dec. 27, 2004.
 Essay on "The Friends of the Friends" by Henry James for Fantastic Metropolis, Dec. 24, 2004.
 Essay on "The Hell Screen" by Akutagawa Ryunosuke, Fantastic Metropolis, Dec. 21, 2004.
 Introduction to Lucius Shepard's short novel Floater, PS Publishing, UK, 2003.
 Curiosities Column, The Magazine of Fantasy & Science Fiction, on The Other Side of the Mountain by Michel Bernanos, June 2000.
 Curiosities Column, The Magazine of Fantasy & Science Fiction, on Katter Murr by E. T. A. Hoffmann, April 1999.

References

External links
 
 
 Golden Gryphon Press official site - About The Fantasy Writer's Assistant and Other Stories
 Golden Gryphon Press official site - About The Empire of Ice Cream
 Interview Interview for Actusf.com
 "The Physiognomy of Jeffrey Ford" Interview for SFcrowsnest.com
 Interview with Jay Tomio

1955 births
Living people
20th-century American novelists
21st-century American novelists
American science fiction writers
American mystery writers
American male novelists
Edgar Award winners
Nebula Award winners
World Fantasy Award-winning writers
Binghamton University alumni
Brookdale Community College faculty
American male short story writers
The Magazine of Fantasy & Science Fiction people
People from West Islip, New York
20th-century American short story writers
21st-century American short story writers
20th-century American male writers
21st-century American male writers
Novelists from New Jersey
Weird fiction writers